An der Via Egnatia - Historisches und Heutiges über Stadt und Messe is a 1957 East German film.

External links
 

1957 films
1957 documentary films
German documentary films
East German films
1950s German-language films
1950s German films